Francis Benson (1 March 1898 – 10 December 1981) was an Irish Gaelic footballer. He won an All-Ireland medal with the Galway senior team in 1925.

Honours

Galway
All-Ireland Senior Football Championship (1): 1925

References

1898 births
1981 deaths
Galway inter-county Gaelic footballers